Settletown is an unincorporated community in St. Francois County, in the U.S. state of Missouri.

Settletown was laid out in 1878, and named after Hattie and William Settle, the original owners of the town site.

References

Unincorporated communities in St. Francois  County, Missouri
Unincorporated communities in Missouri